Tam Pai Doo (lit: Follow to see) is a variety show and light documentary in Thailand produced by Grammy Entertainment and broadcast on Channel 9 on Sunday afternoons in the late 1980s to 1990s, with a 13-years airtime presented by Songwit Jirasopin. It was the first variety show in Thailand.

Presenters
Main presenter
 Songwit Jirasopin
Field presenter/Supporting presenter
 Wiroj Kwantham
 Damrong Puttan
 Sansanee Sitapan Moller
 Ken Streutker
 Morris K.
 Yuwadee Ruangchai
 Numfone Komolthiti 
 John Rattanaveroj
 Witsawa Kijtunkajorn
 Wirote Tungvanich
 Jamjuree Cherdchom

Other media
There is a magazine with the same name.

Awards
 TVG.Awards 1987: Best Variety Show
 TVG.Awards 1989: Best Male Presenter
 Mekala Awards 1990: Best Fiction Program
 Mekala Awards 1991: Best Fiction Program

References

External links
 

1990s Thai television series
1980s Thai television series
1980s documentary television series
1980s variety television series
Thai-language television shows
1990s documentary television series
1990s variety television series